USS Natalie Mae (SP-1005) was a United States Navy patrol vessel in commission during World War I.

However, no other records of Natalie Maes operational history have been found, nor have any records of her characteristics.

Notes

References
  (for USS Nomad (SP-1046))
 SP-1005 Natalie Mae at NavSource Online: Section Patrol Craft (SP) and Civilian Vessels (ID) Index

Patrol vessels of the United States Navy
World War I patrol vessels of the United States